Samuel Shipman (1883 – February 9, 1937) was an American playwright. Several of his plays were adapted to film. He was Jewish.

He visited the Lakewood Theater in Maine with John B. Hymer.

Theater
East is West (1918), with John B. Hymer
The Woman in Room 13 (1919), with Max Marcin and Percival Wilde
Lawful Larceny (1922)
Crime, with John B. Hymer
Fast Life
Creoles (1927)
Trapped (1928)
Fast Life (1928)
Scarlet Pages (1929), with John B. Hymer
She Means Business  (1931)
Alley Cat (1934)
A Lady Detained (1935)
Behind Red Lights (1937)
Louisiana Lady (1947), based on Creoles
Friendly Enemies, with Aaron Hoffman

Filmography
The Woman in Room 13 (1920)
Lawful Larceny (1923), based on his play of the same name
Cheaper to Marry (1925)
Friendly Enemies (1925)
Fast Life (1929)
The Pay-Off (1929), based on his 1927 play, Crime
Scarlet Pages (1930)
Lawful Larceny (1930), based on his 1922 play of the same name
Manhattan Parade (1931), based on Shipman's play
Friendly Enemies (1942)

References

1883 births
1937 deaths
20th-century American dramatists and playwrights
American male dramatists and playwrights
Jewish American writers
20th-century American male writers